Yangzhou (扬州) is a modern prefecture-level city in Jiangsu, China.

Yangzhou may also refer to these places in China:
Yangzhou Subdistrict (洋州街道), a subdistrict in Yang County, Shaanxi
Yangzhou Township (杨洲乡), a township in Wuning County, Jiangxi

Historical locations
Yang Province (揚州), one of the Nine Provinces of ancient China
Yang Prefecture (Jiangsu) (揚州), a former prefecture between the 6th and 20th centuries in modern Jiangsu
Yang Prefecture (Shaanxi) (洋州), a former prefecture between the 6th and 14th centuries in modern Shaanxi

See also
Yang (disambiguation)
Yang Zhou (born 1992), Chinese volleyball player